Jovan Vićić (born 23 February 1997) is a exSerbian footballer, who plays as a goalkeeper. He is working now like a football agent.

Club career

Red Star Belgrade
Born in Loznica, Vićić passed the youth school of Red Star Belgrade and joined the first team in summer 2015. Later he was loaned to GSP Polet on dual registration, where he made 11 appearances in the Serbian League Belgrade for the first half of 2015–16 season. At the beginning of 2016, Vićić signed his first professional contract with Red Star and moved on loan to Serbian First League Loznica. In summer 2016, Vićić spent pre-season training with Red Star, and later he moved on new loan to Kolubara at one-year dual-registration. After he spent the winter break off-season with home club, a loan deal with Kolubara was terminated and he moved to Bežanija until the end of the same season. In summer 2017, Vićić moved on loan to Drina Zvornik. In summer 2018, Vićić released by the club.

Mačva Šabac
On 29 June 2018, it was announced Vićić joined Mačva Šabac as the first summer signing.

International career
Vićić was a member of Serbia U16, Serbia U17 and Serbia U18 national team levels between 2012 and 2015. In February 2016, he became the first footballer in the history of FK Loznica, which invited into national team selection, after he was called by coach Branislav Nikolić for a friendly match of Serbia national under-19 football team against Bulgaria. As a new coach of Serbia U20 national level, Ilija Petković called Vićić into the squad in March 2017.

Career statistics

Club

References

External links
 
 
 

1997 births
Living people
Sportspeople from Loznica
Association football goalkeepers
Serbian footballers
Red Star Belgrade footballers
FK Loznica players
FK Kolubara players
FK Bežanija players
FK Drina Zvornik players
FK Mačva Šabac players
Serbian First League players